Arjei Franklin (born April 25, 1982) is a former Canadian professional football slotback who played for the Calgary Stampeders and the Winnipeg Blue Bombers of the Canadian Football League.

Franklin is an alumnus of Agincourt Collegiate Institute in Scarborough, Ontario.

Professional career

Winnipeg Blue Bombers
Franklin was drafted by the Winnipeg Blue Bombers in the 2006 CFL Draft, 3rd round, 19th overall, after starring at the University of Windsor.

Calgary Stampeders
Franklin was traded to the Calgary Stampeders on September 20, 2009.

On February 7, 2013, Franklin retired from professional football.

Awards and achievements

2004: All-Canadian at inside receiver. OUA First Team All-Star.
2003: OUA Second Team All-Star.
2002: OUA First Team All-Star.

Career statistics

Post-CFL career
In 2018 Franklin began a career as a police constable with the Windsor Police Service in Windsor, Ontario.

References

External links
Arjei Franklin CFL Player Profile
Winnipeg Blue Bombers nio
Franklin's stats at Covers.com

1982 births
Living people
Canadian football wide receivers
Windsor Lancers football players
Winnipeg Blue Bombers players
Calgary Stampeders players
Players of Canadian football from Ontario
Canadian football people from Toronto